James Peter O'Dowd (26 February 1908 – 8 May 1964) was an English professional footballer who played as a central defender. He won three caps for the England national football team. He retired at the age of 29 after suffering a broken leg while playing for Torquay United.

References

1908 births
1964 deaths
Footballers from Halifax, West Yorkshire
English footballers
England international footballers
English expatriate footballers
Expatriate footballers in France
Association football defenders
Selby Town F.C. players
Bradford (Park Avenue) A.F.C. players
Blackburn Rovers F.C. players
Burnley F.C. players
Chelsea F.C. players
Valenciennes FC players
Torquay United F.C. players
English Football League players
Ligue 1 players
English Football League representative players